Solidify may refer to:

 Solidify (Grip Inc. album), the third album from heavy metal band Grip Inc.
Solidify, an album by American Idol contestant Amanda Overmyer
The verb form of solidification (turning into a solid):
Freezing, the solidification of a liquid
Deposition (phase transition), solidification of a gas